Events from the year 1940 in art.

Events
 February – The series of 'Careless Talk Costs Lives' propaganda posters by 'Fougasse' is published by the Ministry of Information (United Kingdom).
 March – The Tartu Art Museum is officially established in Tartu, Estonia; its first exhibition is opened in November 1940.
 July – The Reichsleiter Rosenberg Taskforce (Einsatzstab Reichsleiter Rosenberg) of the Nazi Party begins its task of appropriating cultural property from occupied territories, initially in France.
 October – Grandma Moses' second solo exhibition, "What a Farm Wife Painted", opens at Otto Kallir's Galerie Saint-Etienne in New York City.
 November 3 – The War Artists' Advisory Committee of the U.K. Ministry of Information opens its first exhibition of War Pictures by British Artists to the public at the otherwise-evacuated National Gallery in London.
 November 13 – Release of Walt Disney's animated movie Fantasia in the United States.
 December 8 – Mexican painters Frida Kahlo and Diego Rivera remarry in San Francisco (U.S.)
 Cecil Beaton is among the photographers commissioned by the U.K. Ministry of Information to undertake war photography.
 Xawery Dunikowski is deported to Auschwitz concentration camp, where he survives until 1945.
 Jacques Lipchitz flees France for the United States.
 Henry Moore is commissioned as a war artist and produces drawings of Londoners sleeping in the London Underground while sheltering from The Blitz.
 Anthony Blunt's Artistic Theory in Italy 1450–1600 is published. This year he is recruited to work for MI5 while simultaneously spying for the NKVD.

Awards
 Archibald Prize: Max Meldrum – Dr J Forbes McKenzie

Works

Paintings
 Vanessa Bell – Leonard Woolf
 Clive Branson – Noreen and Rosa
 Howard Chandler Christy – Scene at the Signing of the Constitution of the United States
 Charles Cundall – The Withdrawal from Dunkirk, June 1940
 Salvador Dalí
 The Face of War
 Slave Market with the Disappearing Bust of Voltaire
 'Fougasse' – Careless Talk Costs Lives (propaganda posters)
 Jared French – Glenway Wescott, George Platt Lynes, Monroe Wheeler (series of nude portraits)
 Jesús Guerrero Galván – Head of a Woman
 Edward Hopper
 Gas
 Office at Night
 Frida Kahlo
 The Dream
 Self-Portrait Dedicated to Dr. Eloesser
 Self-Portrait with Cropped Hair
 Self-Portrait with Monkey
 Self-Portrait with Thorn Necklace and Hummingbird
 The Wounded Table
 Raymond McGrath – Training Aircraft Under Construction
 Conroy Maddox – The Strange Country
 Henri Matisse
 La Blouse Roumaine
 Le Rêve de 1940
 Roberto Matta – Dark Light
 John Piper
 Interior of Coventry Cathedral, November 15th, 1940
 The Passage to the Control-room at South West Regional Headquarters, Bristol
 St Mary le Port, Bristol
 Candido Portinari – Seascape
 Eric Ravilious – Watercolours
 A Warship in Dock
 Submarines in Dry Dock
 Ship's Screw on a Railway Truck
 Midnight Sun
 Charles Sheeler
 Bucks County Barn
 Fugue
 Interior
 Situ Qiao – Put Down Your Whip
 Graham Sutherland
 Black Landscape
 Devastation, 1940: A House on the Welsh Border
 Hugh J. Ward – Portrait of Superman (Lehman College)
 Grant Wood – Sentimental Ballad

Photographs
 Herbert Mason – St Paul's Survives
 Nickolas Muray – Soldiers of the Sky

Sculptures

 Eric Aumonier – The Archer (East Finchley tube station, London Passenger Transport Board)
 Carl Milles – The Wedding of the Waters (fountain, St. Louis, Missouri)
 Isamu Noguchi – News (stainless steel bas-relief, Rockefeller Center, New York)
 Attilio Piccirilli – Guglielmo Marconi (bronze, Washington, D.C.)
 José Ângelo Cottinelli Telmo (architect) and Leopoldo de Almeida (sculptor) – Padrão dos Descobrimentos (temporary version)

Births
 January – Anthony d'Offay, British art dealer
 January 2 – Peter Young, American painter
 January 6 – John Byrne, Scottish painter and writer
 January 24
 Vito Acconci, American conceptual artist, installation artist, performance artist and filmmaker (d. 2017)
 Mel Bochner, American conceptual artist
 February 22 – Billy Name, born William Linich, Jr., American photographer, collaborator with Andy Warhol
 March 7 – Hannah Wilke, American painter, sculptor and photographer (d. 1993)
 March 20 – Mary Ellen Mark, American photographer (d. 2015)
 April 11 – Marcia Tucker, American museum curator (d. 2006)
 April 16 – Joan Snyder, American painter
 April 30 – Burt Young, born Gerald DeLouise, American actor, painter and author
 May 1 – Elsa Peretti, Italian jewelry designer (d. 2021)
 May 11 – Juan Downey, Chilean-American video artist (d. 1993)
 May 25 – Nobuyoshi Araki, Japanese photographer
 June 17 – Alton Kelley, American poster and album artist (d. 2008)
 July 5 – Chuck Close, American "photorealistic" painter (d. 2021)
 July 27 – Pina Bausch, German neo-expressionist choreographer and dancer (d. 2009)
 August 23 – Galen Rowell, American wilderness photographer (d. 2002)
 September 6 – Elizabeth Murray, American painter, printmaker and draughtsman (d. 2007)
 September 10 – David Mann, American painter
 September 26 – Arno Rink, German painter and professor
 September 27 – Rudolph Moshammer, German fashion designer (d. 2005)
 October 22 – Ashley Jackson, Malaysian-born Yorkshire landscape watercolourist
 date unknown
 Germano Celant, Italian art critic, curator and historian (d. 2020)
 Stevan Knežević, Serbian painter, sculptor and professor of art (d. 1995)
 Anthony McCall, British-born American avant-garde installation artist, projected film
 Dušan Otašević, Serbian painter and sculptor
 Jaune Quick-to-See Smith, Native American painter and printmaker

Deaths
 January 18 – Jonas Lie, Norwegian American landscape painter (b. 1880)
 February 11 – Ellen Day Hale, American painter and printmaker (b. 1855)
 February 27 – Nicolae Tonitza, Romanian painter and etcher (b. 1886)
 March 16 – Iso Rae, Australian Impressionist painter (b. 1860)
 April 15 – Alexandru Plămădeală, Moldovan sculptor (b. 1888)
 May 13 - Henry Charles Fehr, British sculptor (b. 1867)
 June 21 – Édouard Vuillard, French painter (b. 1868)
 June 29 – Paul Klee, Swiss painter expressionism, cubism, and surrealism (b. 1879)
 July 4 – Józef Pankiewicz, Polish painter, graphic artist and teacher (b. 1866)
 July 28 – Gerda Wegener, Danish artist (b. 1886)
 July 31 – Elfriede Lohse-Wächtler, German avant-garde painter, by involuntary euthanasia (b. 1899)
 August 22 – Paul Gösch, German artist and architect (b. 1885)
 September 15 – Dick Ket, Dutch painter (b. 1902)
 September 27 – Walter Benjamin, German philosopher, "comparatist" and art critic (b. 1892)
 October 15 – Karl Uchermann, Norwegian canine painter (b. 1855)
 November 16 – Colin Gill, English war artist, muralist and portrait painter (b. 1892).
 November 17 – Eric Gill, English sculptor and engraver (b. 1882)
 date unknown – Francesco Stella, Italian painter and set designer (b. 1862)

See also
 1940 in fine arts of the Soviet Union

References

 
Years of the 20th century in art
1940s in art